Shukriya is an Arabic female given name.

Shukriya may also refer to:

Shukriya (TV program), a 2015 Indian reality TV show
Shukriya: Till Death Do Us Apart, a 2004 Indian film

See also